Go Go Cabaret (Around the World) is the full-length debut album from Japanese punk rock band 54 Nude Honeys, released on December 1, 1996.

Track listing

References

1996 debut albums
54 Nude Honeys albums